Olin College of Engineering, officially Franklin W. Olin College of Engineering, is a private college focused on engineering and located in Needham, Massachusetts. Olin College is noted in the engineering community for its relatively recent founding, small size, project-based curriculum, and large endowment funded primarily by the defunct F. W. Olin Foundation. The college covers half of each admitted student's tuition through the Olin Scholarship. Olin College is ranked among the top undergraduate engineering programs within the United States.

History

Olin College was founded by the F. W. Olin Foundation in 1997. The trustees were concerned about perpetuating Franklin W. Olin's donor intent indefinitely, so the foundation's president, Lawrence W. Milas, proposed creating a college. “We always had a bias toward supporting science and engineering schools because Mr. Olin was an engineer,” Milas said. “I was concerned with whether or not this would be consistent with what Mr. Olin had ever considered. I went back and read minutes of board meetings. And sure enough, in the late 1940s, at two or three board meetings shortly before his death, he expressed the idea of starting a new institution.”

By 2005, the foundation had donated most of its financial resources to the college, providing Olin with an endowment of about $460 million. Richard Miller was inaugurated as the college's first president on May 3, 2003. Miller was also the first employee of Olin College, and had been working as its president for several years before he was officially inaugurated.

In a program known as Invention 2000, Olin College hired its first faculty members and invited 30 students, known as Olin Partners, to help it form a curriculum. The students lived in temporary housing and spent their first year after high school investigating assessment and grading methods, jump-starting the student culture, and experimenting with forms of engineering education.

Olin admitted its first full class of 75 students in 2002. This class included the Olin Partners, a group of deferred students known as the Virtual Olin Partners, and recent high school graduates. After admitting three more classes, the college reached its full size of approximately 300 students in fall 2005. It currently has about 390 students.

Olin's campus was designed by the architecture firm Perry Dean Rogers Architects in the postmodern style. The first phase, comprising four buildings, was completed in 2002. The construction of a second dormitory, East Hall, was finished in fall 2005. Future plans include an academic building that would contain additional machine shops and project space. Olin shares many campus services, including health, public safety, and athletic facilities, with Babson College.

Academics

Teaching and learning
Olin College offers degrees in electrical and computer engineering, mechanical engineering and engineering. Within the engineering program, students may concentrate in computing, design, biological engineering, materials science, or systems design, or they may design their own concentrations with the administration's approval.

Unlike many institutions, Olin College does not have separate academic departments. All faculty members hold five-year renewable contracts without offering tenure.

Classes emphasize context and interdisciplinary connections. Freshmen take integrated course blocks that teach engineering, calculus, and physics by exploring the relationships among the three subjects. Arts, humanities, social sciences, and entrepreneurship courses take an interdisciplinary approach to subjects such as the self ("What Is I?"), history ("History of Technology"), and art ("Wired Ensemble" and "Seeing and Hearing"). 

Olin also emphasizes practically grounded education, connecting concepts to real-world challenges and projects. Beginning in their first year, students receive training in Olin's machine shop for project-based work. First-year students are required to take "Design Nature", in which they design and build mechanical toys based on biological systems (such as the click beetle's jumping mechanism). Classes often take a "do-learn" format, with the application of concepts being taught before the formal introduction of the underlying theory.

As part of its mission to redefine engineering education, Olin is continually undergoing curriculum reviews. The goal of these reviews is to ensure that the college maintains a culture of change and continuous improvement. Significant aspects of the curriculum — such as student assessment, course offerings, and student workload — are considered for detailed review yearly.

Olin's academic culture is heavily influenced by its honor code. Exams are usually not held for most courses but a project-based pattern is followed and students have to work on final projects instead. In general, the academic culture is highly informal, and some members of the upper administration teach classes.

Much of Olin College's curriculum is built around hands-on engineering and design projects. This project-based teaching begins in a student's first year and culminates in two senior "capstone" projects. In the engineering capstone, student teams are hired by corporations, non-profit organizations, or entrepreneurial ventures for real-world engineering projects. In the Affordable Design and Entrepreneurship (ADE) capstone, students work on self-designed projects.

Accreditation
Olin College is accredited by the New England Commission of Higher Education and the Accreditation Board for Engineering and Technology.

Admissions and financial aid

Admissions
Admissions to Olin College are highly selective, with, as of Fall 2021, 18% of applicants being admitted and the interquartile (middle 50%) of admitted students submitting scores under Olin College’s test-optional policy having SAT scores between 1500 and 1550 or ACT scores between 34 and 35.  

Admissions Office considers a student's GPA to be a very important academic factor, with a very high emphasis on an applicant's letters of recommendation, application essays, the rigor of academic record, and high school rank. In terms of non-academic materials as of 2022, Olin ranks extracurricular activities, the interview, talent/ability, and character/personal qualities as 'very important' in making first-time, first-year admission decisions, while ranking whether the applicant is a first-generation college applicant, legacy preferences,  state and geographical residence as 'considered'. Volunteer work, racial/ethnic status, and work experience are marked as 'important'. The level of an applicant's interest is highly accounted for in the admission decisions.

Olin College's admission process is non-conventional and follows a two-step process. Applicants first apply for admission through the Common App and all applications are reviewed in January. A holistic review process then carefully evaluates each applicant’s academic and personal qualities to determine whether they will advance to the second phase of the admission process. About 225-250 applicants are invited to participate in the second phase, Candidates’ Weekends, for them to learn more about the Olin community, curriculum, and culture. All applicants who reach the second phase of the process are required to participate in Candidates’ Weekends, as the information gleaned provides the basis for final admission decisions.

Financial aid
All accepted students receive the merit-based Olin Tuition Scholarship, which pays for half of the tuition and covers cross-registration of courses with Babson College, Wellesley College, and Brandeis University. Olin also shares clubs and intramural sports with those colleges. In addition to the Olin Scholarship, Olin follows need-blind admissions and provides need-based grants to meet each student's full demonstrated need. Olin also allows students to receive funding and non-degree credit for "passionate pursuits," personal projects that the college recognizes as having academic value.

It used to provide full-tuition scholarships, but in 2009, responding to a significant decline in the college's endowment caused by the Great Recession, the trustees decided to reduce the merit scholarships to half-tuition for all students since the 2010-11 academic year.

Student life

Dormitories and student housing

Olin College houses students in dorms and suites in either the West Hall or the East Hall. Olin students are required to live on campus unless an exception is made by the dean of student life due to personal circumstances (e.g., for married students or students with families nearby). In addition, the Office of Student Life picks student "resident resources" (R2s) to fill the role traditionally played by resident assistants (RAs) at other schools. Unlike most RAs, R2s are not directly responsible for enforcing dorm policies.

Honor code
The Olin Honor Code has five clauses, titled "Integrity", "Respect for Others", "Passion for the Welfare of Olin College", "Openness to Change", and "Do Something". The code and related policies can be amended by a majority of students at a meeting of at least half of the student body. If students voted to abolish the code, governing policies set by the Office of Student Life would take effect.

The honor board — consisting of students elected by their peers, with one faculty adviser — is the main disciplinary structure at the college. When a violation of the honor code is alleged, the board decides if sanctions are warranted and, if so, what kind of sanctions. Penalties must be approved by the dean of student life.

As of 2017, faculty and teachers are not required to sign the Honor Code as first years are supposed to during orientation.

Extracurricular activities
Students can participate in clubs, community service projects, co-curricular activities with faculty and staff (which are noted on transcripts), and "passionate pursuits" (independent projects eligible for funding and/or non-degree credit).

The college has a variety of clubs and organizations that support the arts, including the Power Chords (an a cappella group), the Franklin W. Olin Players, a film club, and a conductorless orchestra.

Olin does not compete alone in the NCAA, and the regional NCAA conference — the New England Women's and Men's Athletic Conference — has not given approval for students to compete with Babson's varsity teams. Olin students are, however, allowed to participate in club teams and non-NCAA sports at Babson, and the Babson women's rugby team includes several Olin members. Olin has two soccer teams that compete through a Boston athletic organization, as well as an Ultimate team that competes in the BUDA league and the Ultimate Players Association. Additionally, students participate in Sunday morning football games, intramural sports, pick-up Ultimate games, the Student Martial Arts Club, a fencing club, and other athletic organizations.

Campus clubs form in an ad-hoc fashion whenever a group of students unite around a common interest and apply for recognition. Funding is managed by the Student Activities Organization.

Olin students compete in the Mathematical Contest in Modeling every year. In 2002, a team from Olin received the highest rating in the contest; in 2005, an Olin team received the highest rating and earned the INFORMS Prize. Some students compete in design projects at the Society of Automotive Engineers' Mini-Baja competition and the American Society of Mechanical Engineers' Human Powered Vehicle competition. Others are members of the Olin Automatons, a group dedicated to autonomous vehicle technology, which was originally formed to develop an autonomous vehicle for the DARPA Grand Challenge.

The college has no fraternities or sororities. An "underground" alumni group known as the Combs Society works to extend and adapt the Olin culture, brand, and mission.

Mascot
In 2002, the Olin Partners and Virtual Olin Partners selected the phoenix as the school's mascot. The mascot, sometimes unofficially called Frank, represents Olin's willingness to reinvent itself, just as the phoenix is reborn from its ashes. In 2013, Olin underwent a rebranding, and the original school colors, blue and silver, are now seen together only in the school seal and on diplomas. Everywhere else, the school now uses gradients of bright colors.

Reputation and rankings
In the 2022–2023 U.S. News & World Report college rankings, Olin was ranked second for the best undergraduate engineering programs among non-doctorate-granting institutions in the United States. 

, The Princeton Review ranked Olin College second for classroom experience, third for dormitories, third for amount of studying, fourth for student opinion of professors, fifth for ease of getting around campus, eighth for LGBT friendliness, 11th for financial aid, 11th for quality of life, 12th for science laboratory facilities, 17th for career services, and 19th for student happiness.

In 2006, Olin was selected by Kaplan, Inc. and Newsweek as one of "America's 25 New Ivies".

Business Insider ranked Olin first on its "Best 20 College Campuses in the US" list in 2014. It was eighth on Forbes's "Top 25 Colleges Ranked By SAT Score", with an average combined critical reading and math score of 1489.

Media coverage

In 2014, the Boston Globe published an article that criticized the school for poor management of its endowment. The Globe pointed out that despite the abandonment of full-tuition scholarships, Olin's spending remained relatively constant, and payroll costs rose 16% between 2009 and 2011. It also noted that Olin's administrators received "significantly more than the median salaries of executives in comparable positions", and that Moody's had downgraded the institution's bond rating. In an open letter to the Olin community, President Richard Miller defended the decisions of the administration and rebutted several of the points made in the article. The college successfully petitioned the Globe to release an official clarification, which stated that the article had "failed to include the most recent financial information available". The Boston Business Journal also challenged the Globe's assessment of Olin's finances, reporting that revenue and enrollment had "rebounded smartly" in 2013 from recession lows.

Notable alumni 
 Etosha Cave, co-founder and chief scientific officer of Twelve, a carbon dioxide recycling startup
 Frances Haugen, data engineer, scientist, product manager, and Facebook whistleblower
 Kevin Tostado, American documentary filmmaker, and founder of Tostie Productions

See also 
 Association of Independent Technological Universities
 Argosy Foundation

References

External links
Official website

Educational institutions established in 1997
Engineering universities and colleges in Massachusetts
Needham, Massachusetts
Private universities and colleges in Massachusetts
Universities and colleges in Norfolk County, Massachusetts
1997 establishments in Massachusetts